Favianna Rodriguez (born September 26, 1978) is an American artist and activist. She has self-identified as queer and Latina with Afro-Peruvian roots. Rodriguez began as a political poster designer in the 1990s in the struggle for racial justice in Oakland, California. R is known for using her art as a tool for activism. Her designs and projects range on a variety of different issues including globalization, immigration, feminism, patriarchy, interdependence, and genetically modified foods. Rodriguez is a co-founder of Presente.org and is the Executive Director of Culture Strike, "a national arts organization that engages artists, writers and performers in migrant rights. "

Background 

Rodriguez was born in the Fruitvale neighbourhood of east Oakland, California in 1978. Her parents are Peruvian, having migrated to California from Peru in the late 1960s. Rodriguez's artistic talents emerged at a young age; during primary school Rodriguez won art contests and once appeared on Spanish television to share her artwork. Her parents supported her art but pressured her to pursue a career in medicine or engineering.

Fruitvale is a predominantly Latinx neighbourhood and here Rodriguez experienced and became aware of anti-Latinx racism. She observed that students from her community were under-served by the school system and profiled as gang members while she only saw a negative representation of women of colour in the media. Reportedly, to better shape her adolescence, Rodriguez went to live in Mexico City from age 13 to 15, first with her aunt and then in a rented room. Here she became interested in politically engaged artwork, learning the political context of murals and the work of Frida Kahlo with whom she immediately identified. Upon her return to Oakland, she became involved with activism and other Latinx organizers. She created the first Latino club at her school. When she was 16, California Proposition 187 was introduced, marking state level anti-immigrant legislation.

After graduating from Skyline High School in 1996, Rodriguez received numerous scholarships and chose to attend the University of California Berkeley. She withdrew at age 20 indicating she wanted to follow her path rather than limit herself to her parent’s wishes. She was inspired by printmaking, introduced to her by Chicana artist Yreina Cervantez, and decided to pursue a career in political art.

Art and activism
Rodriguez was drawn to posters and reproducible art like printmaking for their power to educate, organize, and liberate communities.
Her illustrations have become synonymous with grassroots efforts to defend a variety of issues ranging from ethnic studies, immigrant and women's rights, affirmative action to patriarchy, interdependence, food justice, environmental and racial justice, sustainability, and youth activism.

Rodriguez's art is typified by high-contrast colours and graphic figures. Rodriguez is renowned for her bold posters on immigration, racism, war, globalization, and social movements.
Rodriguez has worked closely with artists in Mexico, Europe, and Japan, and her works have appeared in collections at Bellas Artes, The Glasgow Print Studio, and the Los Angeles County Museum of Art. In 2008, Rodriguez was named one of Utne Reader magazine's “50 Visionaries Who Is Changing the World."

Organizational involvement
Rodriguez is the Executive Director and co-founder of CultureStrike, a national network of artists and activists who support the national and global art movement around immigration. She serves on the board of Presente.org, a national online organizing network dedicated to the political empowerment of Latino communities. She served as interim co-director until August 2016.

Rodriguez has helped establish multiple organizations to support local communities and artists. She is co-founder of Tumis Inc., a bilingual design studio providing graphics, web, and technology development for social justice. Rodriguez also co-founded EastSide Arts Alliance and Cultural Center, an organization of artists and community organizers intended to promote community sustainability through political and cultural awareness and leadership development.

In 2003, with Jesus Barraza, Rodriguez helped establish the Taller Tupac Amaru print studio to promote the practice of screen printing among California-based artists and foster its resurgence. She is also a member of the Justseeds Cooperative which distributes prints and publications about social and environmental movements. Through these programs, Rodriguez has mentored dozens of emerging young artists and helped establish a multi-use arts facility in the heart of working-class East Oakland.

Rodriguez has lectured at over 200 schools widely on the use and power of art in civic engagement and the work of artists who work to bridge community and museum, the local and international. She also lectures on cultural organizing and technology to inspire social change and leads art workshops at schools nationwide. A few of the many schools Rodriguez has talked at include UC Santa Cruz, Stanford, Michigan State, and Syracuse University.

Influences
Rodriguez has been influenced by the Chicano Movement and feminist art of the 1970s and 1980s. She has studied the history of political art, including the artwork and graphics associated with the Black Panthers and the 1970s feminist movement, through her residency at the Center for the Study of Political Graphics in Los Angeles.

Artists that influence Favianna Rodriguez include: Ester Hernandez, Yolanda Lopez, Rufino Tamayo, Rupert Garcia, Romare Bearden, Pablo Picasso, Taller de Grafica Popular, Ospaaal, Wangechi Mutu, Frida Kahlo, Swoon (artist), and Malaquias Montoya.

Projects
In 2013, Rodriguez worked with the YouTube channel I Am Other to create Migration is Beautiful, a three-part documentary series that addresses the debate surrounding immigration policy in the United States and the perception of immigrants.

She is the co-author of Reproduce and Revolt with Josh MacPhee. Additionally, Rodriguez is a contributor to the Creative Commons.

Rodriguez is well known for her work through an organization called CultureStrike, to promote and sells her poster work that focuses on themes such as environmentalism, immigration, and feminism. Rodriguez's posters have a distinctive and colourful style that takes inspiration from her Latin-American roots in a contemporary context. Her work has been shown all over the US and internationally.

One of her current projects is Pussy Power, which seeks to redefine the pussy as a source of empowerment.

Rodriguez's most recent project in November 2018 is her work with the Ben & Jerry's ice cream company. Rodriguez designed fantastical and colourful packaging for the limited edition flavour, Pecan Resist, which was created to resist the Trump administration. As part of the project, Ben & Jerry's is donating $25,000 to Neta, Color of Change, Honor the Earth, and the Women's March. The design depicts two characters: one is a gender-queer character with their fist up in the air and the other, which holds a sign that reads "resist", is wearing a hijab to pay homage to one of Rodriguez's close friends. The design is vibrant and colourful, and works to empower minorities.

Awards and honors
2012 Emerging Leader Award, Chicana Latina Foundation, San Francisco, CA
2011 Recipient of the Creative Work Fund Award, San Francisco, CA
2011 Recipient of Innovation Grant, Center for Cultural Innovation, Los Angeles, CA
2010 Inducted into Women's Hall of Fame (Alameda County) in Arts & Culture, Alameda County, CA
2009 Recipient of OPEN Foundation Individual Artist Grant, Oakland, CA
2008 Named one of the countries leading 50 visionaries by UTNE Magazine
2008 Sister of Fire Award, Women of Color Resource Center, Oakland, CA
2007 Recipient of the Belle Foundation Individual Artist Award, San Jose, CA
2005 Art Is A Hammer Award from the Center for the Study of Political Graphics, CA

Exhibitions

United States 
 Museo del Barrio (New)
 de Young Museum (San Francisco)
 Mexican Fine Arts Center (Chicago)
 Yerba Buena Center for the Arts (San Francisco)
 Sol Gallery (Providence, RI)
 Huntington Museum and Galería Sin Fronteras (Austin, TX)
 Multicultural Center at the University of California, Santa Barbara (Santa Barbara, California)

Abroad 
 The House of Love & Dissent (Rome)
 Parco Museum (Tokyo)

In addition, her works have been displayed in England, Belgium, and Mexico. She was a 2005 artist-in-residence at San Francisco's de Young Museum, a 2007-2008 artist-in-residence at Kala Art Institute, and received a 2006 Sea Change Residency from the Gaea Foundation (Provincetown, MA). Rodriguez is the recipient of a 2005 award from the Center for the Study of Political Graphics.

References

External links

Favianna Rodriguez's webpage
Culturestrike
Presente
Favianna Rodriguez Papers
Migration is Beautiful 

American printmakers
1978 births
Living people
American women printmakers
American feminists
Hispanic and Latino American people
American LGBT artists
American LGBT rights activists
LGBT Hispanic and Latino American people
LGBT people from California
People from Oakland, California
American people of Peruvian descent
Activists from California
Artists from California
21st-century American women artists